Don R. Pears (September 18, 1899 – July 17, 1992) was a Republican politician from Michigan who served in the Michigan House of Representatives, and as its Speaker during the 70th and 71st Legislatures. He also served as register of deeds and later as clerk of Berrien County.

A lifelong resident of southwest Michigan, Pears was a school principal and a real estate broker. He was also a veteran of the U.S. Army and a member of the American Legion, the Veterans of Foreign Wars, AMVETS, and the Reserve Officers Association, as well as of the Elks, Eagles, Moose, and Odd Fellows.

References

1899 births
1992 deaths
Speakers of the Michigan House of Representatives
Republican Party members of the Michigan House of Representatives
People from Buchanan, Michigan
American school administrators
American real estate brokers
United States Army personnel of World War I
United States Army personnel of World War II
Businesspeople from Michigan
20th-century American politicians
Educators from Michigan
20th-century American businesspeople